James Barlow may refer to:

James Barlow (author) (1921–1973), British novelist
James A. Barlow (1923–2015), American geologist and politician